"For Tonight We Might Die" is the first episode of the British science-fiction television series Class, a spin-off series of Doctor Who. It is written by Patrick Ness and was released online by BBC Three on 22 October 2016. "For Tonight We Might Die" received generally positive reviews from critics.

In the episode, a group of Coal Hill Academy students are forced to work together when the school comes under siege by an alien race called the Shadow Kin, ahead of the school's autumn prom. The episode features a guest appearance by Peter Capaldi as the Doctor, the lead character of Doctor Who.

Plot
April (Sophie Hopkins), a student at Coal Hill Academy, asks Tanya (Vivian Oparah) to help with the decorating for the prom. Tanya has to decline, so April asks Charlie (Greg Austin) to be her date. He rejects her, to the amusement of Ram (Fady Elsayed). The four all attend class with Miss Quill (Katherine Kelly), a blunt and sharp woman. April hands out fliers after school for help with the decorating the prom hall; after speaking to April, Charlie decides that he will ask a male student, Matteusz, to the prom.

Ram attends football practice, and watches as a separate shadow attaches to the shadow of another player. Tanya decides to help out with the prom decorations, before she is chased away by another shadow, and returns home to her strict mother. Charlie lives with Miss Quill, and he questions her about a missing student and whether she killed him. She recalls giving the student her gun, and the student exploded into smoke after firing off a shot.

The headmaster leaves a key with April so that she can decorate the hall. Ram video chats with Tanya, and watches as she is attacked by a shadow alien, while April's hand is trapped by a shadow. Quill demands that April uses her gun to shoot the monster, but Charlie stops her. The shot glances the alien, Corakinus, resulting in him sharing April's heart after his own is displaced. Charlie reveals that he is an alien, and was a prince. His people were at war with the Quill, and "Miss Quill" was the leader of the opposition. She was captured and forced to serve and protect Charlie. Rhodia was attacked by Corakinus's people, the Shadow Kin, who wiped out all but Charlie and Miss Quill, who were rescued by the Doctor.

At the prom, Matteusz cheers April up by inviting her to dance with him and Charlie. Tanya is able to attend, while Ram attends with his date, Rachel (Anna Shaffer). April experiences pains from being linked to Corakinus, and Corakinus appears and kills Rachel, severs Ram's leg, and crushes Quill's gun. The Doctor (Peter Capaldi) arrives to rescue them. Corakinus states that he is here for the Cabinet of Souls, the resting place for Charlie's people after they die; the Kin believe it to be a weapon. Charlie says that the Cabinet is empty. Tanya, with assistance from the Doctor, turns on the gym's flood lights to eliminate the shadows that give the Kin substance.

Ram slams Corakinus back into the rift, and the Doctor closes the breach. The Doctor gives Ram a prosthetic leg from the TARDIS, and charges the five students and Quill to safeguard the school against alien attacks. Whilst Tanya helps Ram deal with his stress, Quill muses that she would have used the Cabinet of Souls to wipe out the Shadow Kin, however Charlie disagrees. Charlie looks into the Cabinet of Souls, revealing that it's not empty, and reassures his people with his presence.

Production

Development

The series was created by young adult fiction writer Patrick Ness. The idea for the show came from Doctor Who itself and was almost a story contained within that parent program — Ness had previously been requested to write an episode treatment for Doctor Who, and this engagement later morphed into his entire own spin-off series. Ness drew upon influences from his previous young adult fiction book called The Rest of Us Just Live Here and specifically from creatures in that book called The Chosen Ones. Steven Moffat is an Executive producer on the show. The production staff aimed to gear the audience towards the young adult demographic, the prior area of fiction writing expertise of Patrick Ness.

The writing style for the show was influenced by prior TV series in the adolescent genre including The Vampire Diaries and Buffy the Vampire Slayer — with both series being directly name-dropped in the first episode itself. Executive producer Brian Minchin said the series would try not to be as dark as prior Doctor Who spin-off show, Torchwood. Minchin, who was also at the same time executive director on Doctor Who itself, was asked by Radio Times why they decided to do a spin-off from Doctor Who at this particular point in time, and he answered the rationale behind the decision to go forwards with the new series was because they were so comfortable with the idea of Patrick Ness at the helm of the show.

Filming and release
Easter egg media references to Doctor Who were intentionally placed throughout the new show by the production staff. One of the producers, Derek Ritchie, told Radio Times: "We’re kind of peppering the show with little easter eggs wherever possible." Ritchie went on to explain further: "So there’s little nods throughout, in design or wherever, that will always link it to the Doctor Who universe. Because that’s so important to our audience as well. To feel part of Doctor Who, but a new part of Doctor Who as well." Easter egg references in the first episode include: nods to previous Doctor Who characters Clara Oswald and Danny Pink, artron energy, as well as the alien box being bigger on the inside.

The first episode was filmed inside of and around the location of Cardiff. The main studio used is Roath Lock Studios in Cardiff. Ed Bazalgette served as director on the first episode. The first episode premiered together along with the second one on BBC Three on 22 October 2016. The TV series' first two episodes were each 45 minutes in duration. They were also released on the same day on BBC iPlayer. After the initial 22 October broadcast, the show had planned airings next on BBC One in the United Kingdom and Australian Broadcasting Corporation — followed by a scheduled broadcast for BBC America in the United States during the year 2017.

Reception
The Guardian gave the show a positive reception, with Phil Harrison writing: "Ever since the sad demise of Torchwood, Doctor Who fans have been looking for something to fill those fallow months when the Tardis is away in another part of the galaxy and Who is missing from our screens. Now they might finally have it." Digital Spy enjoyed the writing style of the episode: "Ness's script zips all over the place, demanding a huge emotional range from Greg Austin (Charlie), Sophie Hopkins (April), Fady Elsayed (Ram) and Vivian Oparah (Tanya) and these kids knock it out of the park, nailing every single beat."

Den of Geek recommended the series and critic Louisa Mellor summed it up as: "Witty, energetic Doctor Who spin-off Class wears its influences well and gets a great deal right for its target audience." WalesOnline gave the series first couple episodes a rating of five starts out of five, with writer David Prince summarizing the show as: "It's a bit like a British Buffy and Cardiff looks amazing - but it's not for kids". CNET really liked the acting from those portraying the young characters in the new series: "The standout is smouldering Fady Elsayed as the cocky but conflicted Ram. Meanwhile, Katherine Kelly chews the scenery as vampy teacher Miss Quill".

Brisbane Times television critic Melinda Houston gave the show a rating of three and a half stars out of four. In a review for Flickering Myth, Alex Moreland rated the first episode of Class with a grade of 9 out of 10 — "Ultimately, Class debuts with a particularly strong first episode; it introduces us to a compelling cast of characters and an establishes an engaging overarching plot. Most importantly of all, though, it makes it obvious that this is a programme that can and will stand on its own – and maybe even surpass Doctor Who, one day." The Daily Telegraph wrote that the first episode was a bit disorganised getting itself off the ground, and comparatively said the writing style had improved by the second episode. Clint Hassell summed up his assessment of the first episode for Doctor Who TV, writing: "Class' theme that teenagers encounter more problems than they can be expected to effectively manage is potent, but portrayed in a very heavy-handed fashion, in this initial episode."

References

External links
"For Tonight We Might Die" at the BBC Class homepage

2016 British television episodes
selected=Television
Doctor Who crossovers
Class (2016 TV series) episodes